Topinabee or Topenebee may refer to:

People 
 Topinabee (I), the elder, a Potawatomi chief
 Topinabee (II), the younger, a Potawatomi chief

Places 
 Topinabee, Michigan, an unincorporated community

Other 
 USS Topenebee, a U.S. Navy ship